Little Havra is a small island off the west of South Mainland in Shetland. It is located west of South Havra.

References
 Shetlopedia

Uninhabited islands of Shetland